Yekaviyeh may refer to:
 Yekaviyeh 1
 Yekaviyeh 2
 Yekaviyeh 3